Cudworth is an urban village approximately  north-east of Barnsley transport interchange in South Yorkshire, England. Historically within the West Riding of Yorkshire, Cudworth has a busy shopping area along the Barnsley to Pontefract Road which serves a local population of 10,977.

The modern village equates roughly to the Cudworth ward of Barnsley Metropolitan Borough Council and with a mix of housing types with a great many developments from the inter-war and post-war periods. These supplement a small residual number of more ancient dwellings and buildings reflecting the importance of the rural economy before the opening of the deep mine collieries in the near vicinity at the end of the 19th and early 20th centuries. The village is still surrounded by open space, including green belt, regenerated public open spaces that were formerly part of neighbouring collieries and the remaining agricultural land which still dominates the south and south-east sides of the village.

Cudworth has two distinct historic centres known as Upper or Over Cudworth and Low or Nether Cudworth. Nether Cudworth was the centre of the old Cudworth manor, Upper Cudworth has road links.

Governance
Since the local government reforms of 1974 Cudworth has been a ward within the Barnsley Metropolitan Borough Council and returns three ward councillors. This same Act saw the establishment of the South Yorkshire metropolitan county, but its council was later abolished and the four constituent boroughs became unitary authorities.

Before the establishment of the Poor Law Union, almost every aspect of local governance had been shared between three authorities; the Justices of the Peace for the West Riding in their Quarter or Special sessions; the Parish of Royston and its Vestry, and the Manor of Cudworth with its Court Baron and Court Leet.

In the period before 1900, Cudworth's governance passed through a number of changes introduced by the Government at Westminster due to the increasing population. The 1873 and 1875 Public Health Acts created Rural Sanitary Districts which effectively gave control of the sewers and other health matters to the local board of Guardians, who had hitherto been responsible for the workhouse and other matters relating to the Poor Laws. The Barnsley Rural Sanitary District which included most of the Barnsley Poor Law Union of which Cudworth was a part was abolished under the 1894 Local Government Act when the Barnsley Rural District Council with elected councillors took over the responsibilities previously administered by the Poor Law Guardians. The new Barnsley Rural District very quickly began to lose territory as the rapid population expansion due to the opening of the deep mine collieries created the need for the urban district councils to act as the first tier of the local authority. Cudworth was the third of the eight civil parishes within Barnsley RDC to leave when the UDC was established in 1900.

Cudworth Urban District existed between 1900 and the 1974 reforms. It had an urban district council as the second tier local authority under the West Riding County Council. The Cudworth Urban District Council was responsible for a great many changes within its boundaries including the development of a number of housing estates, including the Newtown and Birkwood estates and the much later Crown estate. In order to build the Newtown Estate it was necessary to demolish the old Manor House which previously stood on the site occupied by the houses on Lunn Road bearing the inscription commemorating the new estate in 1922.

Transport
A railway station served  between 1840 and 1968.

Road
The shape of the old township of Cudworth is that of an heraldic lozenge. Historically there were three important roads through Cudworth. The two axial roads through the township, the modern main road along the east–west axis is represented by the Barnsley Road in the west and Pontefract Road in the east. The north–south axis was an ancient highway and represented by an aggregate of modern roads, Darfield Road, Snydale Road, Royston Road and the now defunct Downend Hill Lane, which is opposite Royston Road at its junction with Weetshaw Lane.

These two ancient highways combined and ran as one between Snydale Road and Royston Road as they pass through Upper Cudworth. This is probably the principal reason for the existence of Upper Cudworth, the passing traffic, which would have been surprisingly heavy through the mediaeval period from both roads, provided great opportunities for business, offering the needs of contemporary travellers much as a modern motorway service area does today.

Downend Hill Lane is now gated with a no entry sign upon it. This lane was known to have been in regular use by railway workers until the closures of the railway there. The 1963 OS map continues to mark it as a footpath. Enquiries with the local authority  in 2012 revealed that it is no longer shown as a right of way on their definitive rights of way map, but also that no clear evidence has been presented for its stopping up.

The main road through Cudworth was the main road from Barnsley to Pontefract throughout the Middle Ages and the modern era until the new Cudworth and West Green bypass which had been originally scheduled for opening in 2011. The Mayor of Barnsley was able to open it in May 2010, significantly earlier than planned. South Yorkshire Fire and Rescue Service have fully utilized this new road system by the building of the new Cudworth Community Fire Station at the West Green Roundabout opposite the western boundary of the village adjacent to Burton Road and Tumbling Lane.

The importance for much of Barnsley and of Cudworth of a link to Pontefract was due to the feudal connection. The Manor of Cudworth was established as part of a knight's fee within the Honour of Pontefract, and the chief manor of the fee was at Darrington close to Pontefract. Darrington, in turn, was part of the Honour of Pontefract, later the Duchy of Lancaster. The Barnsley and Pontefract Roads through Cudworth were made a part of the responsibility for the Barnsley to Pontefract turnpike trust in 1833. This was the second part of the scheme to Turnpike the road, the first, under the Act of 1825, which had seen the new roads from Barnsley built past Oakwell, Hoyle Mill and Beaver Hole to Cundy Cross and the new road from Cundy Cross to Cudworth Bridge through what later became the village of Lundwood. The turnpike trust were empowered to erect toll gates and side bars at Cudworth Small Bridge in the west and Shafton Two Gates in the east.

The third important road, which ranked in law as a highway during the mediaeval and later periods before the turnpikes, was one of the two roads that gives Shafton Two Gates its name. From the Old Norse/Old Scandinavian gata  meaning way or road, the simple meaning of Two Gates is simply 'Two Roads'. They join together at Shafton. Weetshaw Lane was the northern limb and the Barnsley-Pontefract road the southern limb. Weetshaw lane takes its name from the Weetshaw, a wooded area that bordered the North Field and may also have bordered a farm associated with the early settlement identified by archaeologists in Shafton High Street. The archaeological reports from the preparatory work for the Cudworth-West Green by-pass indicated possible timber pole holes for cattle stockades and houses. Weetshaw is a compound Anglo-Saxon word from the words wēt scæga wet copse, bordering the dike that runs across the northern boundary of Cudworth.

Weetshaw Lane, travelling west away from Shafton, the name changed to Salter's Lane. This is one of many roads and ways in the area with Salter in their title. This name was still in use for the lane at the western end of the North Field of Cudworth and on towards Carlton at least as late as the 1880s as it was recorded on the 1st and 1st revisions of the County Series Ordnance Survey maps of that era. The relevance to the importance of the road is because of the salter's link. Just as the Doncaster Saltersbrook Road ran eventually to the Salter's Brook Bridge above Langsett, so too did the Salter's Lane through Cudworth. The lane ran across to Smithies, thus avoiding Barnsley and joined up to the Penistone Road.

The salters represented the chemical industry of the Middle Ages. Everything that used salt was reliant on the carriers that plied their trade on the salter's roads. Without them, the cloth industry would have been without dyes, herbalists without the power to prepare a great number of their products, salt was the major preservative of food and had a host of other uses. The Salter's Brook is a stream that runs down from the direction of the hills between Langsett and the Holme Valley. It was, and remains a boundary feature, the boundary anciently between Cheshire and Yorkshire and it was where the carriers (usually packhorses) would have crossed the bridge on their trans-Pennine journey from the Cheshire salt mines to Yorkshire. The Doncaster Saltersbrook served the important town of Doncaster, whereas the Salter's lane through Carlton, Cudworth and Shafton ran to Pontefract, in the Middle Ages possibly the most important town in southern Yorkshire. The guide stoop (moved during the preparation for the new by-pass) is dated 1738, was almost certainly originally situated at the junction of Royston Lane with the Salter's Lane and Weetshaw Lane. The law required at the junction of highways (that is those roads that the local parish were liable to keep in repair ) that a guide post be set up indicating the next market town along each of the roads. The towns in this case were Pontefract, Doncaster and Penistone.

There has been some dispute about the original position of this guide stoop, some local commentators speculating that it once stood on the Barnsley to Pontefract road. This clearly was not the case since the market towns mentioned includes Penistone, but omits Barnsley. It would only have been legally compliant on Salter's Lane.

Churches and places of worship

Cudworth was a township and a constituent part of the large rural Anglican parish of Royston until it became part of Monk Bretton chapelry in 1843; it finally became a separate Anglican chapelry in 1893. The District Chapelries of both Monk Bretton and Cudworth later became parishes quite independent of Royston. The church dedicated to St John the Baptist was consecrated before the official commencement of the chapelry district in succession to a chapel of ease previously occupying the buildings of the charity school near the pond. St John's is situated on the High Royd, the highest part of Low Cudworth. The parish was established finally by 10 November 1893, when the Ecclesiastical Commissioners of the Church of England made a double announcement of the vicarage and curacy, with a stipend based upon two benefactions made to the Church. The Commissioners received the benefaction and promised to pay a stipend of £15 per annum and £120 per annum from it. They also set out their rights to any tithe in recompense.
The Commissioners received a further benefaction, and agreed to defray the costs of the building of a parsonage in a decision dated 5 April 1900.

In 1920, a war memorial was erected in the churchyard to commemorate the servicemen of Cudworth who died in World War I; the men and women lost in World War II were added later. The Local Heritage Group organised for the memorial to be refurbished at which time more names were added, including those fallen in more recent conflicts.

St John the Baptist Cudworth  is ordinarily a part of the deanery of Barnsley, Archdeaconry of Pontefract, Diocese of Wakefield and Province of York. The parish has petitioned for pastoral care by a bishop who is not a supporter of the ordination of women, currently therefore the parish is in the care of the Bishop of Pontefract, suffragan in the diocese of Wakefield.

The Roman Catholic church of St Mary Magdelene in Prospect Street was also erected to serve the growing population of miners, railway and other workers who arrived after 1890. This church is within the Deanery of Barnsley and Bishopric of Hallam and Province of Liverpool.

The Methodist traditions have been strong in Cudworth since Charles and John Wesley  first set out on their circuits, especially on the Sheffield circuit. The village was the birthplace of John Smith in January 1794, his parents lived in Low Cudworth. His father, William or "Billy" was a tailor and lay preacher. John was not an adherent of his father's Methodist ideas; he was reputed to have attended a prize-fight in Barnsley and was returning with his drinking companions to Cudworth when he had a Damascene moment. He was sent for training as a Methodist minister and became successful earning the epithet of "The Revivalist" and a global reputation. There are many anecdotal references to John and Charles Wesley preaching on steps alongside White Cross Road and of Charles Wesley sleeping overnight in a cottage that still stands near the slip road for Low Cudworth Green. The original Methodist chapel was on the side of the High Royd facing White Cross Road above what is today Quarry Vale.

Famous people
 
 Darren Gough (b. 1970), the Yorkshire and England cricketer, spent some of his childhood in Cudworth.
 David Hirst (b. 1967), footballer who played for Barnsley, Sheffield Wednesday and England.
 Sir Stephen Houghton, CBE, Leader of Barnsley Metropolitan Council and ward councillor in Cudworth.
 Dorothy Hyman (b. 1941), Olympic sprinter who won silver and bronze medals at the Olympic Games in the 1960s. She also captained the British women's team. She has a stadium named after her.
 Ralph O'Donnell (1931–2011), footballer who played for Sheffield Wednesday.
 Sir Michael Parkinson CBE (b. 1935), journalist and television and radio presenter. 
 Archibald Stinchcombe (1912–1994), who won gold at the 1936 Winter Olympics with the Great Britain national ice hockey team.

Sports
Cudworth has been represented in the FA Cup by two football teams – Cudworth Village F.C. and Cudworth St. Mary's F.C.

The two main junior football clubs in Cudworth are Dorothy Hyman West End and Cudworth Tykes JFC. Cudworth also had one of the biggest junior football teams in Yorkshire, The Pinfold Pumas (known as pinny pumas) has teams from under 6s to under 17s, also 3 girls teams and 2 disability teams.

See also
Listed buildings in Cudworth, South Yorkshire

References

External links

Villages in South Yorkshire
Unparished areas in South Yorkshire
Geography of the Metropolitan Borough of Barnsley